The 1953 Houston Cougars football team was an American football team that represented the University of Houston in the Missouri Valley Conference (MVC) during the 1953 college football season. In its sixth season under head coach Clyde Lee, the team compiled a 4–4–1 record (1–2 against conference opponents) and tied for third place out of five teams in the MVC. Buddy Gillioz and Paul Carr were the team captains. The team played its home games at Rice Stadium in Houston.

Schedule

References

Houston
Houston Cougars football seasons
Houston Cougars football